Raúl Muñoz can refer to:

 Raúl Muñoz (athlete)
 Raúl Muñoz (footballer, born 1919)
 Raúl Muñoz (footballer, born 1975)